Koczała is a former PKP railway station in Koczała (Pomeranian Voivodeship), Poland.

References 
Koczała article at Polish Stations Database, URL accessed at 7 March 2006

External links
 Koczała official website

Railway stations in Pomeranian Voivodeship
Disused railway stations in Pomeranian Voivodeship
Człuchów County